Tom Moore (born July 17, 1938) is a former professional American football player. He was a running back in the National Football League for eight seasons, the first six with the Green Bay Packers. He went to the Pro Bowl after the 1962 season and later played for the Los Angeles Rams and Atlanta Falcons.

Early years
Born and raised in Goodlettsville, Tennessee, Moore played college football at Vanderbilt University in Nashville on both sides of the ball.

Playing career
Moore was the fifth overall pick of the 1960 NFL draft, selected by the Green Bay Packers. He was a three-time NFL champion with the Packers in 1961,  1962, and 1965. Moore was selected for the 1962 Pro Bowl & all-pro selection in 1963 and wore jersey number #25 for the Packers. Starting hall of fame halfback Paul Hornung was suspended by league commissioner Pete Rozelle for the 1963 season and Moore saw increased playing time.

Moore was second-leading rusher on team in 1962 (377 yards) and 1963 (658 yards) behind Jim Taylor.  He scored a career-high seven rushing touchdowns in 1962 season.  Moore gained 2,069 yards on the ground and scored 20 rushing touchdowns and had 71 receptions for 605 yards and seven touchdowns. He played in 78 regular-season games for the Packers.

After six seasons in Green Bay and the addition of Donny Anderson to the roster, Moore was traded to the Los Angeles Rams in April 1966. He caught 60 passes that season, then a league record for a running back. Moore was traded to the second-year Atlanta Falcons in July 1967, after a request to be closer to his business interests. and retired after the season.

Personal life
Moore lives with his wife, Carol, in Hendersonville, Tennessee, northeast of Nashville.  After 23 years in the real estate business, he retired in 1991.

References

External links

 

1938 births
Living people
People from Goodlettsville, Tennessee
Players of American football from Nashville, Tennessee
American football running backs
Vanderbilt Commodores football players
Atlanta Falcons players
Green Bay Packers players
Los Angeles Rams players
Western Conference Pro Bowl players